Levi Davis, Sr. (July 20, 1808 – March 3, 1897) was an American politician and lawyer.

Born in Cecil County, Maryland, Davis was admitted to the Maryland bar. He moved to Vandalia, Illinois. He fought in the Black Hawk War of 1832. Davis was involved with the Whig Party and later with the Republican Party. From 1835 to 1841, Davis served as the Auditor of Public Accounts, State of Illinois. He then continued to practice law. In 1846, Davis moved to Alton, Illinois and continued to practice law. He was the attorney for the Chicago and Alton Railroad. Davis died as a result of a stroke at his son's house in Alton, Illinois.

Notes

External links

1808 births
1897 deaths
People from Alton, Illinois
People from Vandalia, Illinois
People from Cecil County, Maryland
American people of the Black Hawk War
Illinois lawyers
Maryland lawyers
Illinois Republicans
Illinois Whigs
19th-century American politicians
Auditors of Public Accounts of Illinois
19th-century American lawyers